The 2010–11 season in Primera División de Nicaragua will be divided into two tournaments (Apertura and Clausura) and will determine the 57th and 58th champions in the history of the league.
The season will begin on July 25 and end on December 12. It will also provide the sole berth for the 2011–12 CONCACAF Champions League.

Promotion and Relegation
Promoted from Segunda División de Fútbol Nicaragua.
 Champions: Managua F.C.
  América Managua (bought the spot of VCP Chinandega).

Relegated to Segunda División de Fútbol Nicaragua.
 Last place: Chinandega FC
VCP Chinandega (sold their spot to América Managua).

2010–11 teams

Personnel and sponsoring (2010 Apertura)

Managerial Changes

Before the start of the season

During the regular season

Apertura

Regular season

Standings

Finals round

Semi-finals Group

Final

First leg

Second leg

Top scorers Apertura

 Updated to games played on December 6, 2010. 
 Post-season goals are included, unlike other topscorers where only regular season goals count.

Clausura

Personnel and sponsoring (Clausura 2011)

Regular season

Standings

Finals round

Semi-finals Group

Final

First leg

Second leg

Top goalscorers

Aggregate table
Relegation will be determined by the aggregate table of both Apertura and Clausura tournaments.

References

External links
 http://www.elnuevodiario.com.ni/deportes/78320
 https://int.soccerway.com/national/nicaragua/1a-division/2010-2011/apertura/
 http://www.bari91.com/football_stats/Nicaragua,_Primera_Division_de_Nicaragua_-_Torneo_Apertura/2010-2011]
 https://web.archive.org/web/20100802053102/http://www.pinolerosports.com/content/blogcategory/5/23/
 http://www.futbolnica.net/primera
 
 https://web.archive.org/web/20110715084211/http://ni.pinolerosports.com/2008/content/view/4671/1/

Nicaraguan Primera División seasons
1
Nicaragua